Pratt Rocks is a mountain in Greene County, New York. It is located in the Catskill Mountains east of Prattsville. Dog Hill is located north of Pratt Rocks.

References

Mountains of Greene County, New York
Mountains of New York (state)